Yu Chi-hwan (1908–1967), also known by his pen name Cheongma, was a leading twentieth-century Korean poet.

Life
Yu was born in South Gyeongsang Province.  He published at least ten volumes of poetry. The poet collaborated with the occupation forces during Japanese colonial years. In 2005, a plaza with a bust of the poet and five monuments, each inscribed with a poem he wrote, were dedicated at the poet's tomb in Bangha-ri, Dundeok-myon, Geoje, South Gyeongsang Province.

Yu attended Toyoyama Middle School in Japan for four years, then returned to Korea to graduate from Dongrae High School. He entered the Humanities Division of Yonhi College (now Yonsei) in 1927 but withdrew after a  year. In 1937 he managed the coterie journal Physiology (Saengni). In April 1940 he moved to Manchuria. He returned to Korea in June 1946, at which time he established the Tongyeong Cultural Association (Tongyeong munhwa hyeophoe) and joined several other groups as well and. In 1952 he joined the Poetry and Poetics (Siwa siron) circle in Daegu, and in 1955 he oversaw the publication of Green Barley (Cheongmaek), a journal produced by a circle of Gyeongsangnam-do writers. In 1957, he founded the Society of Korean Poets.

His awards include the Seoul Culture Award, Korean Academy of the Arts Distinguished Service Award (Yesurwon gongnosang), and Busan Culture Award. He died on February 13, 1967.

Work
The Korea Literature Translation Institute describes Yu:

Works in translation 
 Imágenes del tiempo, translated by Kim Hyun Chang.  Verbum: Madrid, 2005
 The Wind and the Waves:  Four Modern Korean Poets; Translated and Introduced by Sung-Il Lee.  Asian Humanities Press: Berkeley, Cal., 1989.
 Korean Literature Today: "Yu Chi-Hwan Poems: 'Evening Glow'" etc. Vol. 2. No. 2 P. 11; 
 Yu Chi-Hwan Poems: 'Daffodil'" etc. Vol. 4. No. 4 P. 6; "Yu Chi-Hwan Poems: 'Cliff'" etc. Vol. 6. No. 1 P. 11

Works in Korean (partial) 
Poetry Collections
 Poems of Yoo Chihwan (Cheongmasicho, 1939)
 The Chapter of Life (Saengmyeong-ui Seo)
 The Isle of Ulung (Ulleungdo)
 Journey of a Dragonfly (Cheongnyeong ilgi)
Assorted
 How Happy to Have Loved (Saranghaesseumeuro haengbokhayeonnera), published posthumously, is a selection of two hundred love letters that he wrote to the sijo poet Lee Yeongdo.

Awards 
 Seoul Culture Award
 Korean Academy of the Arts Distinguished Service Award (Yesurwon gongnosang)
 Busan Culture Award

See also
List of Korean-language poets
Korean literature
Korea under Japanese rule
Society of Korean Poets

References

External links 
 https://web.archive.org/web/20051124231804/http://www.sogang.ac.kr/~anthony/klt/99winter/yuchihwan.htm includes  a short biography, characterization of the poet's poetry, and original translations of a number of his poems.
 https://web.archive.org/web/20091028122636/http://geocities.com/lesliebarclay/KoreanPoems.html includes the poem "Rock" in translation.
  Cheongma literary officer 

People from South Gyeongsang Province
Korean male poets
Literature of Korea under Japanese rule
1908 births
1967 deaths
20th-century Korean poets
20th-century male writers